Whidborne is a surname. Notable people with the surname include:

Timothy Whidborne (1927–2021), British artist
Josh Whidborne (born 1989), English ice dancer

See also
George Ferris Whidborne Mortimer (1805–1871), English schoolmaster